The polo competitions at the 2017 Southeast Asian Games in Kuala Lumpur took place at Putrajaya Equestrian Park and the Royal Selangor Polo Club. Polo returns to the competition schedule after edition of the games in 1983 and 2007.

Competition schedule

 Official Draw For Polo (image)
 29th SEA Games Polo Schedule

Participating nations

Team competition

Medal summary

Medal table

Medalists

See also
Equestrian at the 2017 Southeast Asian Games

References

External links
  

2017
 
Southeast Asian Games
2017 Southeast Asian Games events